The R394 is a Regional Route in South Africa. Its southern terminus is the R61 at Magusheni. From there, it heads north-west to where the N2 enters KwaZulu-Natal at Brook's Nek.

References

Regional Routes in the Eastern Cape